Luis Moro (born January 2, 1964) is a Cuban-born American actor, filmmaker, and writer. He first gained notability for co-writing, producing and acting in the film Anne B. Real, which was nominated for two Independent Spirit Award.

Career
In 1991, Moro created and hosted the Real Estate America television series, which followed the format of news magazine shows but covered topics on real estate news. Moro worked in real estate and held a show for 10 years on the local TV station Univision, but in the last eight years he worked on film and stage productions across the country.

Moro received screen story by credit for his screenplay rewrites on Anne B. Real. He also co-wrote all the main hip-hop rap lyrics in the film performed by the lead character of Cynthia. After Anne B. Real, Moro produced three films, the southern drama The Unseen, Love and Suicide, a bilingual love story set in Havana, Cuba that was the first film shot by an American in Cuba since 1959, and Venus & Vegas, a buddy comedy set in Las Vegas.

Moro's other film projects include The Siege and King of the Ants. Moro also performs comedy.

In 2008, Ben Kingsley's SBK-Pictures announced it would work with Moro to produce Whispers Like Thunder, a film about the Conley Sisters legal battle over the Wyandot National Burying Ground in Kansas. Kingsley agreed to play the role of Charles Curtis, the first and only Native American to become Vice President of the United States. The screenplay was written by Moro and Trip Brook.

Political views
Moro has been active in promoting his political views on human rights. According to Vanessa Arrington of the Associated Press, "Cuban-American filmmaker Luis Moro expressed his disdain for the long-standing U.S. trade and travel restrictions against Cuba in a very public way: he made a movie there."

Filmography

See also 

Cuban Americans
Afro-Latinos

References

External links

 Official Website  Moro Films

Cuban film directors
American people of Cuban descent
Cuban male film actors
1974 births
Living people
People from Union City, New Jersey
Cuban film producers
20th-century Cuban male actors
21st-century Cuban male actors